El Quinto Trago (Eng:The Fifth Drink) is a studio album released by Grupo Bryndis.

Track listing
El Quinto Trago (Mauro Posadas) 
La Ultima Cancion (Carlos Roberto Nascimiento) 
Tu Ausencia (Guadalupe Guevara) 
La Vida Es Asi (Juan Guevara) 
Yo Te Perdono (Claudio Pablo Montaño) 
Sueño o Realidad (Guadalupe Guevara) 
Una Vieja Cancion de Amor (Abrahamzon, Ramírez) 
Soledad (Mauro Posadas) 
El Quinto Trago (Mauro Posadas) 
Marchate (Mauro Posadas) 
Fue un Sueño (Gerardo Izaguirre) 
Otro Año (Juan Guevara) 
Perdoname Mi Amor (Juan Guevara)

Grupo Bryndis albums
2004 albums
Disa Records albums